The Group IV tournament was held March 20–24, in Dhaka, Bangladesh, on outdoor hard courts.

Format
The eight teams were split into two groups and played in a round-robin format. The top two teams of each group advanced to the promotion pool, from which the two top teams were promoted to the Asia/Oceania Zone Group III in 2003. The bottom two teams of each group were placed in a second pool to determine places 5–8.

Pool A

Results of Individual Ties

Pool B

Results of Individual Ties

Promotion pool
The top two teams from each of Pools A and B advanced to the Promotion pool. Results and points from games against the opponent from the preliminary round were carried forward.

Results of Individual Ties

Kyrgyzstan and Bahrain promoted to Group III for 2003.

Placement pool
The bottom two teams from Pools A and B were placed in the placement group.  Results and points from games against the opponent from the preliminary round were carried forward.

Results of Individual Ties

References

2002 Davis Cup Asia/Oceania Zone
Davis Cup Asia/Oceania Zone